Pulp is a brand of nectar introduced to the Peruvian market by the Ajegroup in 2004. Pulp is sold in glass bottles of 300 ml and cartons of 150 ml and one litre in the flavors durazno (peach), mango, and piña (pineapple).

See also
 Fruit juice
 Juice vesicles

External links
 Official website of the Ajegroup

References

Peruvian drinks
Ajegroup brands